Staward Halt is a closed stone built railway station situated on a single track branch railway line in Northumberland, England, that ran from  through to .

History
Built to carry freight, primarily the product of local lead mines, the line eventually opened to passengers. The passenger service was run by the North Eastern Railway who took over the line in July 1876.

The station was closed to passengers in September 1930, and for freight when the line closed on 20 November 1950.

References

External links
Staward Halt on Northumbrian Railways

Former North Eastern Railway (UK) stations
Railway stations in Great Britain opened in 1868
Railway stations in Great Britain closed in 1950
Disused railway stations in Northumberland